Black Work is a three-part British detective fiction thriller starring Sheridan Smith as police officer Jo Gillespie. The series, produced by Mammoth Screen in association with LipSync productions and Screen Yorkshire and directed by Michael Samuels, premiered on ITV on 21 June 2015, at 9pm, with two further episodes following. All three episodes are sixty minutes in length. The DVD of the series was released on 6 July 2015.

Cast
 Sheridan Smith as P.C. Jo Gillespie
 Matthew McNulty as D.C Jack Clark
 Andrew Knott as D.C. Lee Miekel
 Ace Bhatti as D.C.I. Jahan Kapoor
 Geraldine James as Chief Constable Carolyn Jarecki
 Douglas Henshall as D.C.S. Will Hepburn
 Andrew Gower as D.C. Jared Ansell
 Kenny Doughty as D.S. Ryan Gillespie
 Phil Davis as D.I. Tom Piper
 Oliver Woollford as Hal Gillespie
 Honor Kneafsy as Melly Gillespie
 Lisa Dillon as Carla Gillespie
 Vinette Robinson as Zoe Nash
 Carla Henry as Vicki Stanton
 James Foster as Steve Glover

Episodes

References

External links

2015 British television series debuts
2015 British television series endings
ITV television dramas
Television series by ITV Studios
Television series by Mammoth Screen
2010s British television miniseries
2010s British drama television series
British detective television series
English-language television shows